is a passenger railway station in located in the town of Hidakagawa, Hidaka District, Wakayama Prefecture, Japan, operated by West Japan Railway Company (JR West).

Lines

Station layout
The station consists of one side platform and one island platform connected to the station building by a footbridge. The station is unattended.

Platforms

Adjacent stations

|-
!colspan=5|West Japan Railway Company (JR West)

History
Wasa Station opened on December 14, 1930. With the privatization of the Japan National Railways (JNR) on April 1, 1987, the station came under the aegis of the West Japan Railway Company.

Passenger statistics
In fiscal 2019, the station was used by an average of 72 passengers daily (boarding passengers only).

Surrounding Area
 Wakayama Nanryo High School
 Hidakagawa Town Tanyu Junior High School
 Wasa Elementary School, Hidakagawa Town
 Hidakagawa Municipal Ekawa Elementary School

See also
List of railway stations in Japan

References

External links

 Wasa Station Official Site

Railway stations in Wakayama Prefecture
Railway stations in Japan opened in 1930
Hidakagawa, Wakayama